The Violin Concerto No. 3 in A major (Hob. VIIa/3) ("Melker Konzert") was composed by Joseph Haydn probably between 1765 and 1770.

References 
Notes

Sources

External links 

Violin Concerto in A major ("Melker Konzert"), H. 7a/3 at Answers.com

Haydn 3
Concertos by Joseph Haydn
Compositions in A major